Jim Morrissey (born December 24, 1962) is a former professional American football linebacker who played in the National Football League (NFL) nine seasons for the Chicago Bears and one season with the Green Bay Packers. He was a member of the Bears team that won Super Bowl XX following the 1985 NFL season. Morrissey had an interception down to the 5-yard line in the Super Bowl. He was also a member of the "Shuffling Crew" in the video The Super Bowl Shuffle. Morrissey was the last Bear to wear number 51 before it was retired in Dick Butkus' honor.

All-Big Ten linebacker at Michigan State University and team captain leaving the school with one of the highest numbers of tackles in school history.

One of five children, Morrissey began his football playing career in his prep school days at Flint's Powers Catholic High School, earning All-American Honors. Morrissey married his high school sweetheart, Amy, with whom he has two daughters and two sons.

1962 births
Living people
American football linebackers
Chicago Bears players
Green Bay Packers players
Michigan State Spartans football players
Players of American football from Flint, Michigan